North Range is a community in the District of Clare in Digby County, Nova Scotia.

References
North Range on Destination Nova Scotia

Communities in Digby County, Nova Scotia
General Service Areas in Nova Scotia